Edward E. Cushman (November 26, 1865 – January 25, 1944) was a United States district judge of the United States District Court for the Western District of Washington.

Education and career

Born in Columbus Junction, Louisa County, Iowa, Cushman read law to enter the bar in Iowa and in Nebraska in 1890. He was in private practice in Stromsburg, Nebraska from 1890 to 1893, and in Tacoma, Washington from 1893 to 1900. He was an Assistant United States Attorney for the District of Washington from 1900 to 1904, and was a special assistant to the United States Attorney General for the Ninth Judicial Circuit from 1904 to 1909. He was a United States Territorial Judge for the United States District Court for the Territory of Alaska from 1909 to 1912.

Federal judicial service

On April 9, 1912, Cushman was nominated by President William Howard Taft to a seat on the United States District Court for the Western District of Washington vacated by Judge George Donworth. Cushman was confirmed by the United States Senate on May 1, 1912, and received his commission the same day. He assumed senior status on November 3, 1939, serving in that capacity until his death on January 25, 1944, in Tacoma.

References

Sources
 

1865 births
1944 deaths
Alaska Territory judges
Judges of the United States District Court for the Western District of Washington
Nebraska lawyers
People from Columbus Junction, Iowa
United States district court judges appointed by William Howard Taft
20th-century American judges
Washington (state) lawyers
United States federal judges admitted to the practice of law by reading law
People from Stromsburg, Nebraska
Assistant United States Attorneys